Ghaziabad Assembly constituency is one of the 403 constituencies of the Uttar Pradesh Legislative Assembly, India. It is a part of the Ghaziabad district and one of the five assembly constituencies in the Ghaziabad Lok Sabha constituency. First election in this assembly constituency was held in 1957 after the "DPACO (1956)" (delimitation order) was passed in 1956. After the "Delimitation of Parliamentary and Assembly Constituencies Order, 2008" was passed in 2008, the constituency was assigned identification number 56. VVPAT facility with EVMs will be here in 2017 U.P. assembly polls.

Wards / Areas
Extent of Ghaziabad Assembly constituency is Ward Nos. 2 to 6, 10, 11, 15, 17, 21, 22, 23,
28, 29, 35, 36, 37, 42, 44, 46, 48, 52, 53, 57 & 59 in Ghaziabad (M Corp.) of Ghaziabad Tehsil.

Members of Legislative Assembly

By Poll

Election results

2022

2017

See also
Ghaziabad district, India
Ghaziabad Lok Sabha constituency
Sixteenth Legislative Assembly of Uttar Pradesh
Uttar Pradesh Legislative Assembly

References

External links
 

Assembly constituencies of Uttar Pradesh
Ghaziabad, Uttar Pradesh
Constituencies established in 1956
1956 establishments in Uttar Pradesh